The Revolutionary Council (Conselho da Revolução) of Portugal, was created on 14 March 1975 by the Assembly of the Armed Forces Movement (Assembleia do Movimento das Forças Armadas) with the goal of achieving the objectives of that movement's program as fast as possible and to provide the Portuguese people the security, the confidence, and social peace necessary achieve those governmental reforms. It was disbanded on 30 September 1982 by the first revision to the 1976 Constitution.

Composition

The Revolutionary Council was composed of the following positions:
 President of the Portuguese Republic
 Chief and Deputy Chief of the Armed Forces General Staff
 Chiefs of Staff of the Army, Navy and Air Force
 14 officers selected by the three branches of the Portuguese Armed Forces
 Prime Minister of Portugal (only if a military officer)

Government of Portugal
1975 establishments in Portugal
Organizations established in 1975